Phlegethontiidae is a family of extinct aistopod amphibians including the genera Phlegethontia and Sillerpeton.

Carboniferous amphibians
Permian amphibians
Aistopods